Flocktown Schoolhouse is located near the intersection of Flocktown and Naughright Roads in Washington Township, Morris County, New Jersey. The schoolhouse was built  and was added to the National Register of Historic Places on November 30, 1982 for its significance in architecture and education.

See also
National Register of Historic Places listings in Morris County, New Jersey

References

Defunct schools in New Jersey
National Register of Historic Places in Morris County, New Jersey
School buildings on the National Register of Historic Places in New Jersey
School buildings completed in 1869
Schools in Morris County, New Jersey
1869 establishments in New Jersey
New Jersey Register of Historic Places
Washington Township, Morris County, New Jersey